The Press Advertisement Institution (BIK), also known as the Press Advertisement Agency, is a public legal entity of the government of Turkey responsible for distribution of government ads to the Turkish newspapers, including private and state-owned. Established in 1961 under the Law No. 195, it is affiliated with the Directorate of Communications and works under the 36 members elected from the Grand National Assembly of Turkey. Members are divided into three groups such as "Press", "Government" and "Impartial".

Composition 
Besides being reviewed by 36 members from the Grand Assembly, the organisation consists of the auditors and the board of directors, which represents it in an equal manner, including its head office and all branches across the country. It is headed by a general manager and is headquartered in three different locations Istanbul, Ankara and Izmir.

Background 
BIK also serves as the largest archive of digital newspapers and has recorded the maximum number of digital newspapers in the country. It also impose sanctions on newspapers and news websites from displaying official advertisements under the press ethics principles, and journalism ethics and standards. If any newspaper running in the country violates the law of Turkey face legal action by cutting down its ads.

The organisation also provide financial assistance to newspapers without taking additional loan charges as per Islamic banking and finance principals. Minority communities such as Greek, Armenian and Jewish are also given financial assistance for running newspapers under the Treaty of Lausanne.

Selection 
BIK held elections for the selection of its members. Newspapers owners who comply with the Press Advertisement Institution legislation and the Article 3 of the Press Advertisement Institution Regulation are also entitled to participate in the election.

Revenue 
BIK has raised ₺53.5 million revenue in 2002 which increased to ₺416 million in 2020. It runs various types of ads in different categories such as real estate, vehicles, personnel recruitment, academic staff and training announcements, tender notification, bankruptcy law cases, and notifications and announcements among other.

Official Announcement Amounts (20002020)

Criticism 
BIK is accused of giving more preference to pro-government newspapers than being a neutral entity. Reports suggest that it gives 78% of the government ads to pro-government newspapers and has arguably reduced 97% of ads to those newspapers who oppose the government policies. Government supporters has utilised ₺141 million 932 932 thousand Turkish lira of the public funds while nine newspapers including Sözcü, Cumhuriyet, BirGün, Evrensel, and Korkusuz experienced 97 percent ad penalties by the government.

The European Centre for Press and Media Freedom indicated that the government of Turkey banned independent media in the country from displaying official advertisements on their newspapers. Evrensel has experienced indefinite sanctions for its role in critical reportage. It was banned in September 2019 until 28 March 2020. However, BIK assured lifting of ban after it held a meeting with the International Press Institute (IPI), Journalists Syndicate of Turkey (TGS), Committee to Protect Journalists (CPJ), Reporters sans Frontières (RSF) and the European Federation of Journalists (EFJ).

External links

 Advertisement announcements website

References 

Regulatory and supervisory agencies of Turkey
1961 establishments in Turkey
Advertising agencies